Du-Ku or dul-kug [du6-ku3]  is a Sumerian word for a sacred place.

Translations
According to Wasilewska et al., du-ku translates as  "holy hill",   "holy mound" [...E-dul-kug... (House which is the holy mound)], or  "great mountain"
According to the University of Pennsylvania online dictionary of Sumerian and Akkadian languages, du-ku is actually du6-ku3, with du6 being defined as a mound or ruin mound, and ku3 as either ritually pure or shining: it is used in the texts on the Univ. of Oxford site as "shining".  There is no mention of nor association with the term "holy", and instead it represents a cultic and cosmic place.

Divine
The location is  otherwise alluded to in sacred texts as a specifically identified  place of godly judgement.

The hill was the location for ritual offerings to Sumerian god(s).
Nungal and the Anunna dwell upon the holy hill in a text written from Gilgamesh.

See also

Hymn to the E-kur
libation
Shamash
Sumerian religion
Göbekli Tepe
Ekur

References 

Mesopotamian religion